Pointe des Cerces is a mountain of Savoie, France. It lies in the Massif des Cerces range. It has an elevation of 3,097 metres above sea level.

References 

Mountains of the Alps
Alpine three-thousanders
Mountains of Savoie